Hazelwood is a historic home located outside Upper Marlboro, Prince George's County, Maryland, United States. The home is a large asymmetrical frame dwelling, built in three discrete sections over a long period of time. They are: a low gambrel-roofed section dating from the 18th century, about 1770; a gable-roofed Federal-style dwelling dating from the very early 19th century; and a tall gable-front Italianate-style central section constructed about 1860. The house stands on high ground west of and overlooking the site of historic Queen Anne town on the Patuxent River. Also on the property are several domestic and agricultural outbuildings, and the reputed sites of two cemeteries.

The original owner was Thomas Lancaster. Later, it was the home of his nephew's son, Major Thomas Lancaster Lansdale.

Hazelwood was listed on the National Register of Historic Places in 1999.

References

External links
Hazelwood, Prince George's County, Inventory No.: PG:74B-13, including photo in 1974, at Maryland Historical Trust website

Historic American Buildings Survey in Maryland
Houses completed in 1770
Houses in Prince George's County, Maryland
Houses on the National Register of Historic Places in Maryland
National Register of Historic Places in Prince George's County, Maryland
1770 establishments in Maryland